(God, you are praised in the stillness), BWV 120.3 (previously BWV 120b), is a cantata by Johann Sebastian Bach. He composed it in 1730 to commemorate the Augsburg Confession.

History and text 
This cantata commemorates the 200th anniversary of the Augsburg Confession. It was first performed 26 June 1730 in the St. Thomas Church, Leipzig. This related work was composed for the Ratswechsel, the inauguration of a new town council, and has a festive scoring with trumpets and timpani. 

The words are found in Picander's , Leipzig, 1732. The chorale is by Martin Luther.

Structure 
The work is in six movements:
Arioso:  (parody of BWV 120/1)
Aria:  (parody of BWV 120/2)
Recitative: 
Aria:  (parody of BWV 120/4)
Recitative: 
Chorale:

References

External links 

1730 compositions
Church cantatas by Johann Sebastian Bach